Charles David Farrell (August 9, 1900 – May 6, 1990) was an American film actor of the 1920s silent era and into the 1930s, and later a television actor. Farrell is probably best recalled for his onscreen romances with actress Janet Gaynor in more than a dozen films, including 7th Heaven, Street Angel, and Lucky Star.

Later in life, he starred on TV in the 1950s sitcoms My Little Margie and played himself in The Charles Farrell Show. He was active in business and civic affairs in Palm Springs, California, serving for a time as mayor.

Biography

Career
Born in Walpole, Massachusetts, he began his career in Hollywood as a bit player for Paramount Pictures. Farrell did extra work for films ranging from The Hunchback of Notre Dame with Lon Chaney, Sr., Cecil B. DeMille's The Ten Commandments, and The Cheat with Pola Negri.

Farrell continued to work throughout the next few years in relatively minor roles without much success until he was signed by Fox Studios and was paired with fellow newcomer Janet Gaynor in the romantic drama 7th Heaven. The film was a public and critical success, and Farrell and Gaynor would go on to star opposite one another in more than a dozen films throughout the late 1920s and into the talkie era of the early 1930s. Unlike many of his silent screen peers, Farrell had little difficulty with "voice troubles" and remained a publicly popular actor throughout the sound era.

Early 1950s
During the early 1950s, a decade after his career in motion pictures had ended, Farrell regained popularity as a co-star on the television series My Little Margie, which aired on CBS and NBC between 1952 and 1955. He played the role of the widower Vern Albright, the father of a young woman, Margie Albright, with a knack for getting into trouble, portrayed by Gale Storm. In 1956, Farrell starred in his own television program, The Charles Farrell Show.

Personal life, public service and retirement

Farrell was romantically involved with Janet Gaynor, with whom he starred in twelve films, from 1926 until her first marriage in 1929. Shaken by the death of his close friend, actor Fred Thomson, Farrell proposed marriage to Gaynor around 1928, but they never married. Years later, Gaynor explained her breakup with Farrell: "I think we loved each other more than we were 'in love.' He played polo, he went to the Hearst Ranch for wild weekends with Marion Davies, he got around to the parties – he was a big, brawny, outdoors type... I was not a party girl... Charlie pressed me to marry him, but we had too many differences. In my era, you didn't live together. It just wasn't done. So I married a San Francisco businessman, Lydell Peck, just to get away from Charlie."

Farrell married former actress Virginia Valli on February 14, 1931; the couple was married until Valli's death from a stroke on September 24, 1968.

In the 1930s, Farrell became a resident of the desert city of Palm Springs, California. In 1934, he opened the popular Palm Springs Racquet Club in the city with his business partner, fellow actor Ralph Bellamy.

A major player in the developing prosperity of Palm Springs in the 1930s through the 1960s, Farrell was elected to the city council in 1946 and served as mayor from 1947 to 1955. The Jack Benny Program regularly featured Farrell when they broadcast from Palm Springs, always reminding the audience he had starred in "7th Heaven".  

Farrell died May 6, 1990, at the age of 89 from heart failure in Palm Springs where he was interred at the Welwood Murray Cemetery.

Awards
For his contributions to both motion pictures and television, Charles Farrell was awarded two stars on the Hollywood Walk of Fame in 1960, located at 7021 Hollywood Boulevard for motion pictures and 1617 Vine Street for television.

In 1992, a Golden Palm Star on the Palm Springs Walk of Stars was dedicated to him.

Filmography
Features:

Short Subjects:
 The Gosh-Darn Mortgage (1926) – Joe Hoskins
 Hollywood Hobbies (1935) – Himself
 Screen Snapshots Series 15, No. 7 (1936) – Himself

See also

 List of Mayors of Palm Springs, California

References

Further reading

External links

 
 Charles Farrell at Golden Silents
 Photographs of Charles Farrell

1900 births
1990 deaths
American actor-politicians
American male film actors
American male silent film actors
American male television actors
Burials at Welwood Murray Cemetery
California city council members
Male actors from Massachusetts
Male actors from Palm Springs, California
Mayors of Palm Springs, California
People from Walpole, Massachusetts
20th-century American male actors
20th Century Studios contract players
20th-century American politicians